Kamla Nehru Institute of Technology (KNIT Sultanpur) is a state government, autonomous engineering institution located in Sultanpur, Uttar Pradesh, India. It is affiliated to Dr. A.P.J. Abdul Kalam Technical University (formerly known as Uttar Pradesh Technical University). It has been ranked amongst the top engineering institutes under AKTU.

History
KNIT was established as the Faculty of Technology in Kamla Nehru Institute of Science and Technology, Lucknow, in 1976 by the Kamla Nehru Memorial Trust. It was taken over by the government of Uttar Pradesh in 1979 with a view to develop an engineering institute in the Eastern region of Uttar Pradesh. In 1983 it was registered as a separate society and was renamed as the Kamla Nehru Institute of Technology.

The institute is affiliated to Dr. A.P.J. Abdul Kalam Technical University, Lucknow. Kamla Nehru Institute of Technology, Sultanpur has been officially ranked number 1 based on the performance of the students.

Courses of study
The institute offers the following courses under a semester system.

Undergraduate programs: B.Tech (4 years - 8 semesters)

The B.Tech. curriculum prescribed by Abdul Kalam Technical University Lucknow comprises a full-time four-year course approved by AICTE. The curriculum consists of theory courses, practicals, projects and seminars. It also provides weightage for industrial training and extracurricular activities.

The theory courses are composed of basic science and humanities subjects, engineering courses, core courses and departmental specialized courses with a proportion of 16%, 34% and 50% respectively. There is an emphasis on computer education, and for this each branch, except computer science and engineering, and information technology, includes some computing papers.

Students do industrial training of 6 weeks at the third year level in industry. The students deliver seminars in the third year on advanced topics.

The intakes are:
 Computer Science and Engineering (intake 60 + 06 lateral entries)
 Information Technology (intake 60 + 06 lateral entries)
 Electronics Engineering (intake 60 + 06 lateral entries)
 Electrical Engineering (intake 60 + 06 lateral entries)
 Mechanical Engineering (intake 60 + 06 lateral entries)
 Civil Engineering (intake 60 + 06 lateral entries)

5% of the seats are reserved for the NRIs and 10 seats for other states nominees.

Master of Computer Applications (MCA) (2 years - 4 semesters)
This programme fulfills the industry's need for software professionals. MCA is a six-semester full-time postgraduate programme spread over three years. The MCA Programme was introduced in the institute in 1988 with its first batch passing out in 1991, initially with an intake of 30 students, which was increased to 60 students in 2000.

The MCA programme runs under the Computer Science and Engineering Department. Experts from industry and academic institutions are invited to deliver lectures on advancements in the field of Computer Science.

Full-time postgraduate (M.Tech)

 Computer Science and Engineering - 18 seats
 Electronics Engineering (Comm. Engg.) - 18 seats
 Electrical Engineering (Power Electronics and Drives) - 18 seats
 Mechanical Engineering - 18 seats
 Civil Engineering (Geo Technical) - 18 seats

Part-time (M.Tech) programme (five semesters) course

 Computer Sc. & Engg. (18 seats)
 Electronics Engineering (Digital Electronics and Systems)
 Electrical Engineering (Solid State Control/Power System)
 Mechanical Engineering (Machine Design/Industrial System Engineering)
 Civil Engineering (Water Resources Engineering /Geotechnical Engineering)

All branches have 13 seats in all except for Computer Sc. & Engg. where intake is 18, totalling to 70.

Doctoral programmes
 Computer Science and Engineering
 Electronics Engineering
 Electrical Engineering
 Civil Engineering
 Applied Mathematics
 Applied Physics
 Applied Chemistry
 Humanities

Departments 
The institute has following academic departments:
 Department of Applied Sciences & Humanities
 Department of Civil Engineering
 Department of Electrical Engineering
 Department of Electronics Engineering
 Department of Mechanical Engineering
 Department of Computer Science & Engineering (includes M.C.A and Information Technology)
 Workshop
 Central Library

Centre of Excellence 

 Power and Energy Research Centre (PERC)

Campus facilities and amenities
KNIT has a 100-acre campus with different blocks allotted for various academic activities which include co-curricular and extra co-curricular activities. Apart from hostels, KNIT has admin blocks, a CSA(Council of student activities) hall, KNIT grounds, Academic block, various engineering labs like Fluid mechanics lab, Research and development lab, Microprocessor lab and Workshops which consist of various shops like welding, foundry, carpentry, etc. that are generally included in engineering syllabuses across the country. Many of the labs like networking, Java and various CSED (Computer science and Engineering Department labs) are located in academic blocks. 

The institute maintains a health center equipped with an ambulance to provide primary health care facilities to its students and staff under a fulltime medical officer and pharmacists. However, cases requiring specialized treatment are referred to the District Hospital, Sultanpur.

In-campus hostels 

 Ramanujan Hostel (single seater)
 Khosla Hostel
 Gargi Hostel
 Aryabhatta Hostel
 Old V.S Hostel
 New V.S Hostel
 Raman Hostel
 Kalam Hostel
 Old Maitreyee Hostel
 New Maitreyee Hostel
 Vikram Sarabhai Hostel
 Meghnath Saha Hostel
 Bhabha Hostel

External links

References

Engineering colleges in Uttar Pradesh
All India Council for Technical Education
Sultanpur, Uttar Pradesh
Memorials to Kamala Nehru
1975 establishments in Uttar Pradesh
Dr. A.P.J. Abdul Kalam Technical University